The Hotel Washington is a historic hotel located at 515 15th Street NW (between Pennsylvania Avenue and F Street) in downtown Washington, D.C.

History
The Hotel Washington opened on April 4, 1918. Designed by the architectural firm of Carrère and Hastings, the ten-story, Beaux-Arts hotel is the only commercial building designed by the firm in Washington, D.C. The facade features cream colored sgraffito decoration on a reddish-brown ground.

The Hotel Washington was listed on the National Register of Historic Places (NRHP) in 1995; in addition, the building is a contributing property to the Fifteenth Street Financial Historic District, listed on the NRHP in 2006, and the Pennsylvania Avenue National Historic Site.

On 14 October 2005, George H. W. Bush, Barbara Bush and Eunice Kennedy Shriver attended a press conference at the hotel to unveil The Extra Mile - Points of Light Volunteer Pathway.  It is a mile-long pathway of bronze medallions on 15th Street.  Various staff members from the Corporation for National and Community Service and AmeriCorps NCCC attended the event at the hotel.  After the press conference concluded, Pres. Bush, Mrs. Bush and Mrs. Kennedy Shriver walked up 15th street to see the medallions.  

Following a 2006 buyout and extensive renovation, the property reopened in 2008 as the 317-room W Washington D.C. In 2021 the building was sold, ending its franchise with W Hotels and reverting to an independent Hotel Washington.

In popular culture
The hotel was seen in the films Contact and The Firm. Its roof terrace figured in the movies The Godfather Part II and No Way Out. Frank Murphy and John Nance Garner lived there. The entrance of the hotel was shown in the film Silkwood. The rooftop bar POV is also the location of Diana (Gal Gadot) and Barbara's (Kristen Wiig) lunch in the Wonder Woman sequel WW84.

Notes

External links

 
Three Stories From Hotel Washington - Ghosts of DC blog

Beaux-Arts architecture in Washington, D.C.
Hotel buildings completed in 1918
Hotels established in 1918
Hotel buildings on the National Register of Historic Places in Washington, D.C.
Hotels in Washington, D.C.
Individually listed contributing properties to historic districts on the National Register in Washington, D.C.
Warren and Wetmore buildings